Lisa Marie Varon (née Sole; born February 10, 1971) is an American retired fitness competitor, bodybuilder and semi-retired professional wrestler best known for her tenure with WWE under the ring name Victoria and her time spent as an Impact Wrestling Knockout under the ring name Tara. Varon held both companies woman's championships on several occasions.

Varon began competing in fitness competitions and won ESPN2's Fitness America Series in 1997. In 1999, she placed second at a fitness event in New York City to earn her International Federation of BodyBuilders (IFBB) Professional Fitness Card. Varon met World Wrestling Federation (WWF) performer Chyna, who encouraged her to become a professional wrestler. She trained in the WWF's developmental territories for three years before moving to the main roster to compete full-time under the ring name Victoria.

Varon had her first television appearance at WrestleMania 2000, where she portrayed one of The Godfather's "Hos". She debuted in June 2002 and was pushed to win the WWE Women's Championship, a title she would go on to hold twice in her wrestling career. After leaving WWE in 2009, Varon debuted in TNA later that year as Tara. In TNA, she became a five-time TNA Knockouts Champion, making her a seven-time Women's Champion overall. She was also a one-time TNA Knockouts Tag Team Champion, with Brooke Tessmacher, collectively known as TnT.

Early life 
Varon was born in San Bernardino, California, to a Puerto Rican father (who is a Vietnam veteran) and a Korean-born Turkish mother who worked as a singer in Japan. She grew up with three older brothers, all of whom became amateur wrestlers, with her oldest brother, Bobby, winning a gold medal at the 1983 Pan American Games. Varon attended Eisenhower High School in Rialto, California. During high school, she was active in cheerleading, a sport in which she competed since the sixth grade.

During her senior year in high school, she was nationally recognized by the National Cheerleading Association, earning an All-American award and being chosen to cheer at half-time of the NFL 1989 Pro Bowl, alongside 70 other women. She participated in track and field events in the ninth grade. After graduating, she studied biology at the University of California, Los Angeles and she studied medicine at Loma Linda University, with the intent on becoming a physician. She worked as a human tissue coordinator at the Inland Eye and Tissue Bank in Redlands, California, where she was involved in the process of organ donation.

Bodybuilding and fitness career 
While working at the eye and tissue bank, Varon became a personal trainer and taught aerobics. While training at a gym, she was offered an opportunity to compete in a bodybuilding competition, a contest she won as a middleweight. She competed in fitness competitions, such as ESPN2's Fitness America Series in 1997 and 1998, winning the former, and the Miss Galaxy Competition in 1998, where she met and befriended Torrie Wilson. After Wilson moved to Los Angeles, California and signed with the professional wrestling promotion World Championship Wrestling (WCW), she invited Varon to one of the shows. While backstage, an agent asked her to appear in a segment with Scott Hall. Through Wilson, Varon unsuccessfully attempted to obtain a contract with WCW. She later moved to Los Angeles to find work in televised news fitness segments. In 1999, she earned her International Federation of BodyBuilders (IFBB) Professional Fitness Card after placing second at the National Physique Committee (NPC) Team Universe show in New York City. It was during her time working in fitness competitions that Varon also first met Trish Stratus.

Professional wrestling career

World Wrestling Federation/Entertainment

Training and debut (2000–2001) 
After moving to Los Angeles, Varon worked as a trainer at the gym Crunch Fitness, where she met World Wrestling Federation wrestler Chyna, who complimented Varon on her appearance and encouraged her to become a wrestler. Varon would then put together a biography package and sent it to the WWF. She heard from Kevin Kelly two days later, who invited her to an interview in a month's time. With no previous wrestling experience, she looked up professional wrestling schools, and eventually began training at Ultimate Pro Wrestling (UPW) in Southern California in June 2000. She wrestled under the ring name Head Bitch In Charge (HBIC), and appeared in a cheerleading outfit, with a snooty gimmick, similar to WCW Nitro Girl Miss Hancock. She impressed WWF talent scout Bruce Prichard during her first UPW show.

Varon made her on-screen debut in the WWF portraying one of The Godfather's "hos". She was referred to as the "head ho", and led the "Save the Hos" campaign. On the August 7 episode of Raw, Varon took a bump by being powerbombed through a table by The Godfather's next persona, The Goodfather. After this, she was given the name Victoria. She was removed from television in November, and sent to WWF's then-developmental territory Power Pro Wrestling in Memphis for extensive training. In February 2001, she was aligned with Brandon Baxter and Bobby Eaton in a feud with Bill Dundee, Jerry Lawler and The Kat. Throughout the feud, Victoria and Baxter were manipulating Eaton into fighting with Dundee, going so far as blurring fact and fiction by mixing professional and personal lives, including having Bobby's son Dylan call on the phone and a kayfabe wedding between Victoria and Eaton. Unfortunately, the feud didn't have a proper end, as in March 2001, the WWF severed ties with Power Pro over Jerry Lawler's quitting the promotion over the Kat's firing in late February. Power Pro folded shortly thereafter.

After Power Pro folded, she quickly joined Memphis Championship Wrestling (MCW). Victoria briefly acted as the commissioner for MCW, and was involved in storyline feud with Ivory. She also managed Steve Bradley before MCW closed in 2001. Varon later relocated to Louisville, Kentucky to train in Ohio Valley Wrestling (OVW), using the ring name Queen Victoria. She was placed as the manager of the tag team the Basham Brothers, and managed one of the team members, Doug Basham, to win the OVW Heavyweight Championship on July 25, 2001.

Women's Championship reigns (2002–2004) 
Varon returned to the renamed World Wrestling Entertainment (WWE) as Victoria on the July 7, 2002 episode of Sunday Night Heat, in an angle with Trish Stratus, who Victoria claimed had betrayed her when they worked together as fitness models. The storyline had her character become a demented, sadistic villainess, as she and Stratus feuded for months. Her first pay-per-view match came at No Mercy, where she was defeated by Stratus. The following month at Survivor Series, Victoria defeated Stratus with a Snap Suplex in a hardcore match, to win the WWE Women's Championship for the first time. Victoria would go on to successfully retain her championship against Stacy Keibler, with the debut of her finishing move, the Widows Peak. The following night on Raw, Victoria was attacked in the ring by Stratus. Steven Richards came to her aid, establishing an on-screen relationship between Victoria and Richards. At Armageddon, Victoria began using the entrance theme "All The Things She Said" by t.A.T.u. She defeated Stratus and Jacqueline to retain the WWE Women's Championship in a triple threat match.

Victoria continued to feud with Trish Stratus into 2003, competing against her in successful title defenses and mixed tag team matches, during which Victoria teamed with Richards. At WrestleMania XIX, Victoria dropped the Women's Championship back to Stratus during a Triple Threat match that also involved Jazz. Throughout the rest of the year, Victoria was involved in matches against other Divas, such as participating in a Fatal Four-Way match for the Women's Championship at Judgment Day, and defeating Lita in the first women's steel cage match in WWE history on November 24. Victoria also defeated Ivory in a number one contender's match for the Women's Championship on the last episode of Sunday Night Heat of 2003. After the match, Women's Champion Molly Holly struck Victoria in the head with the title belt.

The next week on Raw, Victoria became a fan favorite, when she attacked Holly after the two women were placed in a team, along with Miss Jackie, for a six-woman tag team match. During her face run, she abandoned her sadistic and unstable personality, and began wearing hippie shorts and performed a gyrating moonsault. On January 5, 2004, Victoria was set for a title match with Molly Holly, however she was attacked by Test before the match.

The angle with Molly Holly continued into the next year, with Victoria defeating Holly in tag team matches. On February 23, 2004, Victoria defeated Holly, Lita and Jazz in a fatal four-way elimination match, to win her second Women's Championship. After defeating Holly in a tag team match the next week, Victoria was challenged by Holly to a rematch for the title at WrestleMania XX, which later became a hair vs title match. At the pay-per-view, Victoria won the match, and shaved Holly's head bald. She held the Women's Championship until June 13, when she dropped the title to the villainous Trish Stratus during a Fatal Four-Way match at Bad Blood, that also included Lita and Gail Kim, and was unsuccessful in regaining it in a rematch a week later. After defeating Molly Holly at Vengeance to become the number one contender, Victoria lost to Stratus at Unforgiven for the championship. Prior to Unforgiven, several of Victoria's matches were interrupted by a mysterious person in drag, who was later revealed to be Steven Richards, with whom she was previously allied. After the match with Stratus, the storyline culminated when Richards challenged Stratus' ally Tyson Tomko to a match, which Richards lost.

Vince's Devils (2005–2006) 

On the May 30, 2005 episode of Raw, Victoria participated in a swimsuit contest, losing to Christy Hemme. Following the loss, the storyline had Victoria become a villainess by attacking the other contestants, as well as host Jerry Lawler, claiming that she had enough of the attention Hemme was receiving. The two engaged in a short feud which culminated in a match at Vengeance, which Victoria won. During her heel run, Victoria adopted the gimmick of a bully-like enforcer, when she was placed in an angle alongside Torrie Wilson and Candice Michelle (collectively known as the Ladies in Pink, and later Vince's Devils) on August 29, portraying the role of the group's enforcer, as the three women joined forces against the 2005 Diva Search winner Ashley Massaro. Massaro was assisted in the storyline feud by Trish Stratus, and at Unforgiven, Victoria and Wilson were defeated by Stratus and Massaro. The angle continued into WWE Homecoming, where the Ladies in Pink lost a Handicap Bra and Panties match to Stratus and Massaro. The three of them competed in the first ever Bra and Panties gauntlet match, where Ashley was declared the winner by last eliminating Victoria. She lost to male wrestler Carlito on the December 26, 2005 Raw. At the 2006 Royal Rumble, they appeared flirting with Vince McMahon.

On March 6, 2006 on Raw, Victoria and Candice turned on Wilson during Candice's Playboy cover unveiling, starting an angle between the former teammates. A scheduled match was set to take place at Saturday Night's Main Event XXXII with Victoria and Candice against Wilson and Stratus. As part of the storyline, however, on the episode of Raw prior to the event, Wilson was found unconscious, with the implication being that Victoria and Candice had attacked her. The match eventually took place on March 27, with Victoria and Candice being defeated. The alliance of Victoria and Candice fell apart during a tag team match on July 17, in which Victoria and Mickie James were defeated by Wilson and Trish Stratus, with Candice as the special guest referee.

SmackDown and departure (2007–2009) 
Victoria was given a push on November 27, after she won a number one contender's battle royal. Varon gained notoriety from the match when it was reported that her kick to Candice Michelle's face had resulted in a legitimate broken nose that required surgery. Following the victory, the angle had her carry a checklist to the ring which contained the names of other Divas. Each week, she checked a name off the list after defeating them in matches. She also defeated WWE Women's Champion Mickie James in a non-title match. Victoria lost the championship match against James at New Year's Revolution, and a rematch on January 15, 2007.

On June 17, Victoria was moved to the SmackDown! brand as part of the WWE Supplemental Draft. Victoria became involved in an on-screen relationship with Kenny Dykstra, and the duo was placed in feuds against Torrie Wilson and Jimmy Wang Yang, as well as Michelle McCool and Chuck Palumbo. While on a tour of Europe with WWE in December 2007, Varon claimed to have legitimately broken McCool's nose.

Victoria later allied herself with the debuting Natalya in April. At the Backlash pay-per-view on April 27, Victoria teamed up with Natalya, Beth Phoenix, Jillian Hall, Layla and Melina to defeat Mickie James, Maria Kanellis, Ashley, Michelle McCool, Cherry and Kelly Kelly. On the May 2 episode of SmackDown, Victoria and Natalya defeated McCool and Cherry. In October, Victoria lost to the debuting Brie Bella, when Brie disappeared under the ring during the match, emerged appearing refreshed, and won. On the September 26 episode of SmackDown, Victoria and Natalya lost to Maria and Brie. On the October 31 episode of SmackDown, Victoria teamed up with Natalya and Maryse in losing effort to Michelle McCool, Maria and Brie. On the November 7 episode of SmackDown, Victoria was accompanied by Natalya, where she was once again defeated by Brie. After the match, it was revealed that Brie had been switching places under the ring with her twin sister, Nikki Bella, and the twins proceeded to attack Victoria and Natalya. On the November 21 episode of SmackDown, Victoria teamed up with Natalya in losing effort to The Bella Twins (Nikki and Brie). On the November 28 episode of SmackDown, Victoria teamed up with Natalya and Maryse to defeat the Bella Twins and Michelle McCool.

With two more years of her contract remaining, Varon asked for her release when WWE told her they have no plans for her. Her last match took place on the January 16, 2009 episode of SmackDown, against Michelle McCool. She then thanked the fans, and gave farewell to staff at ringside.

After leaving WWE, Varon began training for a career in mixed martial arts, and practiced Jiu Jitsu. She returned to WWE for one night only in April 2009, when she was part of the 25 Divas battle royal at WrestleMania XXV, outlasting the five other former WWE Divas. She eliminated Maria, but was eliminated by The Bella Twins.

Total Nonstop Action Wrestling

Debut and Knockouts Champion (2009–2010) 

On May 24, 2009, Total Nonstop Action Wrestling (TNA) confirmed that Varon had signed a contract with the company. She debuted on the May 28, 2009 episode of TNA Impact!, under the ring name Tara, later revealed to be short for "Tarantula". She made her intentions known by attacking The Beautiful People (Angelina Love, Velvet Sky, and Madison Rayne) after Love's match with Sojournor Bolt, establishing herself as a fan favorite. On the June 11 episode of Impact!, Tara won her debut match against Madison Rayne. On the July 1 episode of Impact!, Tara began bringing her pet tarantula, named Poison, with her to the ring. After winning a tag team match against The Beautiful People, she put the spider on the unconscious body of Velvet Sky. On the July 9 episode of Impact!, after Tara threatened to put her spider on Sky once again, Angelina Love agreed to put her TNA Knockouts Championship on the line, which Tara ultimately won, only to lose the title back to Love two weeks later at Victory Road.

On the September 24 episode of Impact!, Tara teamed with the new Knockouts Champion ODB to challenge Sarita and Taylor Wilde for the TNA Knockouts Tag Team Championship, but they lost after Awesome Kong interrupted and distracted her during the bout. During the following two weeks of Impact!, Tara and Kong both received one-on-one Knockouts Championship matches from ODB, but both of them ended up losing after the other interfered in the match. At Bound for Glory, ODB defeated both Tara and Kong in a three-way match to retain the title. During the match, Tara was confronted by mixed martial artist Kim Couture to set up an MMA fight between the two, which, however, never came to fruition. At Turning Point, Tara defeated Kong in a Six Sides of Steel match. On November 26, Tara won a ten-woman battle royal to earn a shot at the Knockouts Championship at Final Resolution. At the event, she defeated ODB to win the Knockouts Championship for the second time. On the January 4, 2010 episode of Impact!, Tara lost the title back to ODB. Two weeks later at Genesis, Tara defeated ODB in a two out of three falls match to regain the title, making her a three-time champion.

On the February 18, 2010 episode of Impact!, Tara defeated Daffney by disqualification, after she hit Tara with a toolbox. At Destination X, Tara successfully defended her title against Daffney, who stole Poison the tarantula from her after the match. On the March 29 episode of Impact!, Tara retained her title against Daffney for a second time, this time in the first ever women's First Blood match in TNA. On the April 5 episode of Impact!, Tara was one of the four winners in an eight-Knockout Lockbox match. The box she opened contained her pet tarantula, Poison. At the same time, however, Tara lost the Knockouts Championship to Angelina Love, and began turning villainous due to her friction with Love heading into their match against The Beautiful People (Madison Rayne and Velvet Sky). At Lockdown, the villainous Tara attacked Love after losing a tag team steel cage match against Rayne and Sky, cementing Tara's heel turn.

Alliance with Madison Rayne (2010–2011) 
On April 28, 2010, Varon announced on her MySpace blog that she would be leaving TNA the following month, after refusing to re-sign with the company, due to not receiving a pay increase. On the May 3 episode of Impact!, Tara challenged Madison Rayne to a match at Sacrifice, where she would put her career on the line against Rayne's Knockouts Championship. At Sacrifice on May 16, Tara failed to win the match, and as a result her TNA career came to an end. After her TNA career came to a halt, she continued to discuss a new contract with Dixie Carter.

She returned to the company on July 11 at Victory Road as a villainess, disguising herself by wearing a motorcycle helmet and attacking Angelina Love during her match for the Knockouts Championship. In the following weeks, she aligned herself with Madison Rayne against Love and Velvet Sky. Tara was ultimately unmasked on the September 2 episode of Impact!, when she and Rayne defeated Love and Sky in a tag team match, after hitting Sky with the motorcycle helmet. On the September 30 episode of Impact!, Rayne signed a waiver to allow Tara to return to in-ring competition. At Bound for Glory, Tara defeated Angelina Love, Velvet Sky, and Madison Rayne in a Four Corners match to win the Knockout Championship for the fourth time, much to the dismay of Rayne, who thought Tara's intention was to help her regain the title. On the following episode of Impact!, Tara laid down for Rayne and allowed her to pin her to regain the Knockouts Championship, giving Tara the shortest reign in the title's history. The following week, Tara attacked Mickie James after her victory over Sarita. At Turning Point, Tara wrestled James to a double disqualification, after James pushed the referee, and they began brawling. On the December 2 Impact!, Tara attacked James while she was singing her single "Hardcore Country", which later led to James attacking her. At Final Resolution, Tara defeated James in a Falls Count Anywhere match, following interference from Madison Rayne. On the following episode of Impact!, James defeated Tara in a steel cage match. During the match, Tara legitimately tore a ligament in her elbow, but the injury did not require surgery. On the December 16 episode of Impact!, Tara and Rayne defeated James and Ms. Tessmacher to advance the finals of a tournament for the vacant TNA Knockouts Tag Team Championship. The following week, they were defeated in the finals by Angelina Love and Winter.

In 2011, Madison Rayne would start a rivalry with Mickie James over the Knockouts Championship, and would successfully defend the title against her at Genesis and Against All Odds, after Tara interfered in both matches. During the feud, Tara began claiming that Rayne had gone too far in her brutality towards Mickie James, but was forced to follow her orders due to being under exclusive contract with her, and not TNA. After Rayne lost the Knockouts Championship to James at Lockdown, James agreed to give her a rematch on the condition that if she is unable to regain the title, Tara would be released from her contract with Rayne. On May 15 at Sacrifice, Tara became a fan favorite after knocking out Rayne during her match with James, costing her the Knockouts Championship and guaranteeing herself a release from her contract with Rayne.

TnT and relationship with Jesse (2011–2013) 

Tara and Madison Rayne had their first match against each other since the break–up of their partnership on the May 19 episode of Impact Wrestling, where Tara teamed with Mickie James and Ms. Tessmacher against Rayne, Sarita and Rosita. Tara won the match for her team by pinning Rosita, after Rayne, who avoided her former partner throughout the match, sacrificed her in order to get away from the ring. Tara and Rayne faced each other again on the July 14 episode of Impact Wrestling, where Tara was victorious after distracting Rayne with her tarantula. On the July 21 episode of Impact Wrestling, Tara and Ms. Tessmacher, later named TnT, defeated Mexican America (Rosita and Sarita) to win the TNA Knockouts Tag Team Championship. Tessmacher and Tara made their first title defense on August 7 at Hardcore Justice, defeating Mexican America in a rematch. On the September 29 episode of Impact Wrestling, Tara was defeated by her former partner Madison Rayne in a match to determine the third and final challenger for the TNA Knockouts Championship at Bound for Glory. On the November 3 episode of Impact Wrestling, Tara and Tessmacher lost the Knockouts Tag Team Championship to Gail Kim and Madison Rayne. On the January 26, 2012 episode of Impact Wrestling, Tara defeated Mickie James and Velvet Sky in a three-way match to earn a match for the Knockouts Championship. On February 12 at Against All Odds, Tara was unsuccessful in her title challenge against Gail Kim.

On the August 23 episode of Impact Wrestling, Tara defeated the new Knockouts Champion and TnT partner Miss Tessmacher in a non-title match, and was subsequently named number one contender for her title. On September 9 at the No Surrender, Tara challenged Tessmacher for the Knockouts Championship, but failed to capture the title.
On the following episode of Impact Wrestling, Tara congratulated Tessmacher on her victory, only to attack Tessmacher shortly afterwards, turning Tara into a villainess and effectively disbanding TnT. On the September 27 episode of Impact Wrestling, Tara defeated ODB in a number one contender's match to earn another shot at Miss Tessmacher's Knockouts Championship. On October 14 at Bound for Glory, Tara defeated Tessmacher to win the TNA Knockouts Championship for a record-tying fifth time. Afterwards, Tara introduced her "Hollywood boyfriend", the debuting Jesse. Tara made her first successful title defense on the October 25 episode of Impact Wrestling, defeating Tessmacher in a rematch following interference from Jesse. On November 11 at Turning Point, Tara and Jesse were defeated by ODB and Eric Young. On December 9 at Final Resolution, Tara successfully defended her Knockouts Championship against Mickie James after a distraction from Jesse. On the December 20 episode of Impact Wrestling, Tara defeated James again to retain her title. Tara went on to have another successful title defense on the January 25, 2013, episode of Impact Wrestling, defeating Velvet Sky. On the February 21 episode of Impact Wrestling taped in London, England, Tara lost the championship to Sky in a fatal four-way elimination match, also involving Gail Kim and Miss Tessmacher, ending her reign at 104 days. Tara received her rematch on the February 28 episode of Impact Wrestling, but was again defeated by Sky. The following months, Tara would make increasingly fewer appearances, and would be rarely used competing in matches. On the July 14 episode of TNA Xplosion, Tara would wrestle her final match in TNA losing to ODB. Two days later on July 16, Tara was released from her TNA contract.
Varon later stated in an interview that she was close to leaving TNA prior to her release, and that she would never return to TNA. She also stated that her tenure in TNA was great, but different from WWE and made her "appreciate WWE a lot".

Independent circuit (2011–2019) 
Tara took part of Family Wrestling Entertainment's FWE: Fallout pay-per-view on November 15, 2011, defeating Madison Rayne with Christy Hemme as the special guest referee. Tara returned to the promotion on February 25, 2012, taking part of a tournament to determinate the inaugural FWE Women's Champion at FWE: No Limits, losing to Maria Kanellis. Tara then helped Maria defeat Winter to win the championship alongside her partner Ms. Tessmacher. On November 9, 2013, Varon debuted at House of Hardcore 3, where she and Stevie Richards were defeated by Carlito and Rosita.

Varon debuted for Ring of Honor on October 26, 2013, under her real name. She made an FAQ before Glory by Honor XII. At the event, she attacked Maria Kanellis with a Widow's Peak.

On June 19, 2015, Varon appeared at Maryland Championship Wrestling's Ladies Night event as the special guest referee for the MCW Women's Championship main event match between Mickie James and Amber Rodriguez, attacking villainous enforcer Melina during the match following Melina's attack towards James, who went on to capture the title.

On September 2, 2016, Victoria made her debut for Chikara, when she entered the 2016 King of Trios tournament as part of Team Original Divas Revolution, alongside Jazz and Mickie James. They defeated Team Shimmer (Candice LeRae, Crazy Mary Dobson and Solo Darling) in their first round match. The following day, Team Original Divas Revolution was eliminated from the tournament by The Warriors Three (Oleg the Usurper, Princess KimberLee and ThunderFrog).

On December 2, 2017, Varon appeared at House of Hardcore 36 as Candice Michelle's opponent in Candice's retirement match. Varon turned heel and attacked Candice after feigning an injury, only to be defeated by Candice with a DDT.

On January 6, 2019, Varon announced that it would be her last year as an active wrestler. She competed in her last match in the main event at Master of Ring Entertainment on September 21, 2019; defeating Melina to become the inaugural MORE Women's Champion.

On November 18, 2020 in an interview with WrestlingInc.com, Varon expressed interest in working with All Elite Wrestling (AEW) in a behind-the-scene capacity. She feels she can accomplish a lot for the company as a trainer and agent and share her extensive knowledge about the business.

Return to WWE and Impact Wrestling (2021-2023)
At the 2021 Royal Rumble, Victoria was the tenth entrant in the Women's Royal Rumble match, marking her first appearance with WWE in almost twelve years. Victoria was the fifth contestant to be eliminated after being thrown over the top rope by Shayna Baszler. Later that year, the WWE Network included her in a list of top 50 female performers in the history of the company.

On January 13, 2023, Varon appeared as Tara in Impact Wrestling at Hard To Kill 2023 to support Mickie James in her title vs. career match against Jordynne Grace, appearing in a backstage segment and in-ring to celebrate with James upon her victory. It was reported that on January 14, Tara returned during Impact television tapings, teaming up with Gisele Shaw to challenge the Death Dollz (Jessicka and Taya Valkyrie) for the Impact Knockouts World Tag Team Championship in a losing effort.

Professional wrestling style and persona 
Varon's finisher is a gory neckbreaker called the Widow's Peak. According to Varon, she credits Roderick Strong for the move, while also crediting Molly Holly for suggesting the move. Holly then reveals that she wrestled with Strong in their teens, in which Holly saw Strong using the move and decided to pass the knowledge of the move to Varon.

Other media 
Varon has made guest appearances on television shows V.I.P. and Nikki, as well as participated in two fitness competitions for the Univision program Sábado Gigante. In November 2010, she was a contestant on an all-TNA week of Family Feud, teaming with Angelina Love, Christy Hemme, Lacey Von Erich and Velvet Sky against Jay Lethal, Matt Morgan, Mick Foley, Mr. Anderson and Rob Van Dam. On November 10, 2012, Varon, along with several other TNA employees, were featured in an episode of MTV's Made. 

Varon has appeared in multiple WWE video games. These include: WWE Wrestlemania XIX, WWE Raw 2, WWE Smackdown! Here Comes the Pain, WWE Day of Reckoning, WWE Smackdown vs Raw, and WWE Smackdown vs Raw 2009.

Personal life 
Varon was married to Lee Varon from 1994 to 2015. They had no children. Varon claims that during a separation from her husband in 2002, she briefly dated fellow wrestler John Cena. The relationship between Varon and Cena had previously been mentioned by another wrestler, Kenny Dykstra.

Varon has a tattoo of a heart on her ankle, which she got in high school and hid from her parents. She is a fan of motorcycles and owns a Suzuki Hayabusa. Varon is Jewish.

Business ventures
Varon owned a restaurant in Louisville, Kentucky named Fat Tony's Pizzeria, but sold it in May 2007. In May 2008, she and her husband opened a custom car shop, Black Widow Customs, in Louisville. The shop was destroyed on December 16, 2010, in a fire, which the authorities deemed suspicious. This occurred the day after a local TV show's "Consumer Watch" segment. Antwane Glenn, a football player at the University of Kentucky, wanted a refund after claiming his car was left un-drivable following Black Widow Customs' work on it. He contacted WHAS11 and the story was profiled on the show.

In March 2013, Varon opened a wrestling themed restaurant in Chicago, Illinois named The Squared Circle. In January 2015, Varon announced that she would be moving back to California, and leaving the restaurant to be run by her estranged husband Lee Varon. In March 2015, the restaurant was put up for sale. One week later, a gunman entered the restaurant and Lee Varon was able to incapacitate the man until police arrived. Days after the gunman incident and the resulting media attention, Lisa Marie Varon announced her intention to close the establishment and that she would no longer support the business or encourage fellow wrestlers to make promotional appearances there. The restaurant closed on April 10, 2017, just two years after the gunman incident.

Championships and accomplishments

Cheerleading 
 National Cheerleading Association
 NCA All-American Award

Fitness and figure competition 
 Debbie Kruck Fitness Classic
 1st (Tall Class; 1999)
 ESPN2 Fitness America Series
 1st place (1997)
 2nd place (1998)
 Lifequest Triple Crown
 Top 20 (1997)
 National Physique Committee
 NPC Inland Empire – 1st (MW; 1995)
 NPC Team Universe – 2nd (Tall Class; 1999)
 Women's Tri-Fitness
 Ironwoman Tri-Fitness – 4th (1998)
 Tri-Fitness Hall of Fame (2012)

Professional wrestling 
 Cauliflower Alley Club
 Women's Wrestling Award (2015)
 Master of Ring Entertainment
 MORE Wrestling Women's Heavyweight Championship (1 time) 
 Pro Wrestling Illustrated
 PWI Woman of the Year (2004)
 Ranked No. 5 of the top 50 female wrestlers in the PWI Female 50 in 2009
 Total Nonstop Action Wrestling
 TNA Knockouts Championship (5 times)
 TNA Knockouts Tag Team Championship (1 time) – with Brooke Tessmacher
 World Wrestling Entertainment
 WWE Women's Championship (2 times)
Other titles
National Don’t H8 Ringmaster (2017)

Luchas de Apuestas record

References

External links 

 
 
 

1971 births
American cheerleaders
American female bodybuilders
American female professional wrestlers
American jujutsuka
American people of Puerto Rican descent
American people of Turkish descent
American television actresses
Female models from California
Fitness and figure competitors
Jewish American sportspeople
Jewish professional wrestlers
Living people
Loma Linda University alumni
Professional wrestlers from California
Professional wrestling managers and valets
Sportspeople from Louisville, Kentucky
Sportspeople from Rialto, California
Sportspeople from San Bernardino, California
University of California, Los Angeles alumni
WWF/WWE Women's Champions
21st-century American Jews
21st-century American women
21st-century professional wrestlers
TNA/Impact Knockouts World Champions
TNA/Impact Knockouts World Tag Team Champions